Digital Praise was a Christian-themed video game developer. It has produced Dance Praise, Guitar Praise, Adventures in Odyssey, VeggieTales Dance, Dance, Dance, and other video games.

It won the Addy Awards for "Mixed Media (Cross Platform)
Campaign" in 2008. It intended to merge (but failed) with Left Behind Games, which closed in 2011. The deal was lost due to Left Behind Games reneging their end of the contract.

References

External links 
 

Companies based in Alameda, California
Christian video games
Newark, California
Defunct video game companies of the United States
Video game development companies